Todd Perry (born  December 13, 1986) is a Canadian professional ice hockey player with the Reading Royals of the ECHL.

Playing career
Perry was born in Ingleside, Ontario. He spent both the 2004–05 and 2005–06 season playing for the Barrie Colts but was traded to the London Knights after spending two seasons with the Colts. Perry played with the London Knights for the 2006–07 season, recording 1 goal and 18 assists for 19 points in 67 games.

After playing four professional seasons in Russia, culminating in a 9-game stint with Admiral Vladivostok in the Kontinental Hockey League, Perry returned to North America in signing a one-year ECHL contract with former club, the Reading Royals, for the 2015–16 season on October 7, 2015.

Career statistics

References

External links

1986 births
Admiral Vladivostok players
Barrie Colts players
Boston College Eagles men's ice hockey players
Canadian ice hockey defencemen
Columbia Inferno players
Ice hockey people from Ontario
Living people
London Knights players
Reading Royals players
Saryarka Karagandy players
Toronto Marlies players
Worcester Sharks players
Canadian expatriate ice hockey players in Russia